Football Academy of Šiauliai or FA Šiauliai is a Lithuanian football academy from the city of Šiauliai. The team is simply known as "Šiauliai". The academy train women's and men's teams, as well as children's and underage groups in "U" type championships.

History
Football Academy of Šiauliai was established in 2007, after a merger between Napolis Šiauliai and "Klevas" school of sport.

Men's team
Men's football team participates under name FA Šiauliai.

In 2010 and 2016 the team played in Šiauliai region championship of the III Lyga (4th tier).

In 2017 and 2018 team played in II Lyga (3rd tier). In 2017 the team achieved 4th position and 6th in 2018.

In 2018 Lithuanian Football Cup, FA Šiauliai lost to FK Sūduva Marijampolė 0:7 in 1/32 round.

In 2019 FA Šiauliai applied for a license to play in I Lyga (2nd tier), despite the fact that they finished 6th in 2018 II Lyga. The club failed to satisfy licensing criteria, and I Lyga license was not issued. However, the club was granted an exception, the club played in 2019 LFF I Lyga and finished in 6th position.

Women's team

Futsal team
FA Šiauliai men's futsal team joined the top division Futsal A Lyga in 2019-2020 season.

Recent seasons

Stadium

Savivaldybė Stadium (Municipality stadium) is a multi-purpose stadium in Šiauliai, Lithuania. It is currently used mostly for football matches, and is the home stadium of FA Šiauliai. The stadium capacity is 4,000. The stadium is located at: S. Daukanto g. 23, Šiauliai.

Current squad
 

 (on loan to Banga)

Famous players
  Deividas Lunskis (2017, 2018)
  Daniel Romanovskij (since December 2021)

Managers
  Renatas Vestartas (since 2017 till the end of 2020 season)
  Mindaugas Čepas (since 2021)

References

External links
 Official site

Association football clubs established in 2007
2007 establishments in Lithuania
Sport in Šiauliai